Barrie Betts (18 September 1932 – 17 November 2018) was an English professional footballer who played at centre back.

Biography 
He was born in Barnsley  and transferred from Stockport County in 1960 to Manchester City with whom he stayed until 1964. In this time he made 101 appearances and scored five goals before transferring to Scunthorpe United.

He finished his career with non league Lancaster City, where he managed the team between 1970 and 1972.

References

1932 births
2018 deaths
Footballers from Barnsley
English footballers
English football managers
Stockport County F.C. players
Manchester City F.C. players
Scunthorpe United F.C. players
Lancaster City F.C. players
Lancaster City F.C. managers
English Football League players
Barnsley F.C. players
Association football central defenders